William L. Reese (1921 - September 22, 2017) was a faculty member in the Department of Philosophy, State University of New York at Albany. He was born in Jefferson City, Missouri.

Reese gained his PhD from the University of Chicago in 1947. From 1967 to 1999 he was Professor of Philosophy at the State University of New York at Albany, and since 1999 has been professor emeritus and research professor in philosophy at the university.

Works
Dictionary of Philosophy and Religion: Eastern and Western Thought, New Jersey: Humanities Press Inc., 1980. 
"The Ascent from Below: An Introduction to Philosophical Inquiry," Boston: Houghton Mifflin Co., 1959. No ISBN
"Philosophers Speak of God" with Charles Hartshorne, Humanity Books, 2nd Ed. 2000.

See also
 American philosophy
 List of American philosophers

References

External links
Dictionary of Philosophy and Religion

American philosophers
1921 births
2017 deaths
University of Chicago alumni
University at Albany, SUNY faculty